Geoffrey Samuel Scott (31 October 1956 – 17 October 2018) was an English professional footballer who made 176 appearances in the Football League playing for Stoke City, Leicester City, Birmingham City, Charlton Athletic, Middlesbrough, Northampton Town and Cambridge United. He played as a defender.

Football career
Scott was born in Birmingham, and played began his career with Aston Villa. He failed to earn a professional contract with Villa and played non-league football for Kings Heath, Solihull Borough and Highgate United before joining Stoke City in 1977. He made his Football League debut on 22 October 1977 as a substitute in a 2–1 defeat away at Blackburn Rovers. He played regularly for Stoke, making 78 league appearances in two-and-a-half years, and was part of the side that gained promotion to the First Division in the 1978–79 season. He played 16 First Division games before signing for Leicester City as the replacement for Dennis Rofe who had recently joined Chelsea.

Scott spent two years at Leicester, and was part of the side that won the Second Division title in the 1979–80 season. He played 39 league games, before signing for Birmingham City. Scott remained at Birmingham only a few months, then played for Charlton Athletic, Middlesbrough, Northampton Town and Cambridge United, where his League career ended because of injury. He returned to the Birmingham area and played for Solihull Borough, Moor Green and Highgate United, becoming player-manager of the latter club in the 1988–89 season.

After football
After retiring from the game, Scott took a degree in business studies and worked in the telecommunications industry. He returned to football when appointed secretary of the Stoke City Old Boys Association, and became chief executive of Xpro, an organisation supporting the health and welfare of former professional footballers.

Scott suffered from cancer in his later years and died on 17 October 2018 at the age of 61.

Career statistics
Source:

A.  The "Other" column constitutes appearances and goals in the Football League Trophy.

Honours
 Stoke City
 Football League Second Division third-place promotion: 1978–79

 Leicester City
 Football League Second Division champions: 1979–80

References

1956 births
2018 deaths
Footballers from Birmingham, West Midlands
English footballers
Association football defenders
Solihull Borough F.C. players
Stoke City F.C. players
Leicester City F.C. players
Birmingham City F.C. players
Charlton Athletic F.C. players
Middlesbrough F.C. players
Northampton Town F.C. players
Cambridge United F.C. players
Moor Green F.C. players
English Football League players
Highgate United F.C. players
Highgate United F.C. managers
English football managers